Wescley Gomes dos Santos (born 11 October 1991), simply known as Wescley, is a Brazilian footballer who plays as an attacking midfielder for Gol Gohar.

Career
In February 2019, Wescley signed a three-year contract with Ceará.

Career statistics

Honours
Ceará
Campeonato Cearense: 2018
Copa do Nordeste: 2020

References

External links

1991 births
Living people
Footballers from Rio de Janeiro (city)
Brazilian footballers
Association football midfielders
Campeonato Brasileiro Série A players
Campeonato Brasileiro Série B players
Campeonato Brasileiro Série C players
Clube Atlético Mineiro players
Democrata Futebol Clube players
Vila Nova Futebol Clube players
Red Bull Brasil players
Ipatinga Futebol Clube players
Associação Chapecoense de Futebol players
Santa Cruz Futebol Clube players
Ceará Sporting Club players
Associação Ferroviária de Esportes players
Esporte Clube Juventude players
J1 League players
Vissel Kobe players
Persian Gulf Pro League players
Gol Gohar players
Brazilian expatriate footballers
Brazilian expatriate sportspeople in Japan
Expatriate footballers in Japan
Brazilian expatriate sportspeople in Iran
Expatriate footballers in Iran